Dandi may refer to:

Places
 Dandi, Iran, a city in Zanjan Province
 Dandi, Navsari, a village in Gujarat, India, destination of Mahatma Gandhi's Salt March
 Dandi Census Town, a Census Town in Maharashtra, India
 Dandi, Nigeria, a Local Government Area in Kebbi State

People
 Dandamis (real name Dandi or Dandi-Swami), 4th century BC Hindu philosopher
 Daṇḍin or Dandi, 6th-7th century Sanskrit writer
 Dandi Adigal Nayanar, Hindu saint
 Dandi Daley Mackall, American Christian author

Other uses
 The plural of danda, a punctuation character in Indic languages
 Sticks used in classical Indian dance
 Dandi, one of three dinosaur mascots of NC Dinos, a Korean professional baseball team

See also
 Dande, a municipality in Bengo Province in Angola
 Dandy (disambiguation)
 Danda (disambiguation)